The Baker-Merrill House is a historic house located at 38 Grove Road in Easton, Washington County, New York.

Description and history 
The house was built in the Federal and Greek Revival styles of architecture.

It was listed on the National Register of Historic Places on July 26, 2006.

References

Houses on the National Register of Historic Places in New York (state)
Italianate architecture in New York (state)
Houses in Washington County, New York
Greek Revival houses in New York (state)
National Register of Historic Places in Washington County, New York